Aphomia homochroa is a species of snout moth in the genus Aphomia. It was described by Alfred Jefferis Turner in 1905 and is known from Australia (it was described from Queensland).

References

Moths described in 1905
Tirathabini
Moths of Australia